A protectionist is someone who upholds the economic policy of restraining trade between states.

Protectionist may also refer to:

 Australian Protectionist Party, a current Australian political party
 Liberal Protectionist, a Canadian political party
 Protectionist Party, a historical Australian political party
 Protectionist Party (Sweden), a Swedish political party
 Protectionist (horse), winner of the 2014 Melbourne Cup